Sabari River is one of the main tributaries of Godavari. It originates from the western slopes of Eastern Ghats in Odisha state from Sinkaram hill ranges at 1370 m MSL. It is also known as Kolab river in Odisha.The Sabari river basin receives nearly 1250 mm annual average rainfall. It forms common boundary between Chhattisgarh and Odisha states and later enters into Andhra Pradesh to merge with River Godavari. Upper Kolab project, located in Odisha across the Sabari is a major dam project supplying water for irrigation and Hydro power generation.
 
The 200 km long stretch of the river forming boundary between Chhattisgarh and Odisha drops by 2.25 meters per km length on average. This stretch of the river has substantial hydro electricity generation potential by building medium head (< 20 m) barrages in series to minimize land submergence. The surplus water of Indravati River in Odisha can also be diverted to Sabari river via Jaura Nallah through which  Indravati flood waters naturally overflow into Sabari basin.

Sileru River (known as Machkund in its upper reaches) is the major tributary of Sabari which joins Sabari river at tri-junction boundary point of Andhra Pradesh, Chhattisgarh and Odisha. Sileru river has huge potential of hydro electricity generation which has been substantially harnessed by constructing Machkund, Balimela, upper Sileru, Donkarayi and lower Sileru hydro power projects.

See also
 Polavaram Project

References 

Rivers of Odisha
Rivers of Chhattisgarh
Rivers of Andhra Pradesh
Tributaries of the Godavari River
Rivers of India